Ernst Emil Georg Zeibig (10 September 1901 – 8 July 1981) was a French swimmer who competed at the 1924 and 1928 Summer Olympics. In 1924 he was eliminated in the heats of 100 m backstroke and 100 m and 4 × 200 m freestyle events. In 1928 he competed only in backstroke, and again failed to reach the final.

References

External links
 

1901 births
1981 deaths
French male freestyle swimmers
Swimmers at the 1924 Summer Olympics
Swimmers at the 1928 Summer Olympics
French male backstroke swimmers
Olympic swimmers of France
20th-century French people